CCL may refer to:

Brands, enterprises, and organizations
 Cable Consortium of Liberia
 Canadian Congress of Labour, a Canadian trade union federation
 Carnival Corporation & plc, stock ticker symbol for the parent company of Carnival Cruise Line
 Carnival Cruise Line
 Caribbean Congress of Labour
 CCL Industries Inc., a Toronto, Ontario-based company
 Central Coalfields
 Christian Copyright Licensing International, a company that sells copyrighted works for use in worship services
 Citizens' Climate Lobby, an international environmental group seeking to accelerate the transition from fossil fuels to renewable energy using carbon pricing
 Commonwealth Countries League, a civil society organization
 Couple to Couple League, an international organization teaching natural family planning

Computing and technology
 Cerner CCL (Cerner Command Language), a SQL-like programming language developed by Cerner Corporation
 Clozure CL, a Common Lisp implementation
 Communications Controller for Linux, an IBM networking software product
 Concise Command Language (CCL), a DEC command line interpreter for PDP-8, 10, 11

Educational institutions and libraries
 Christ College of Law, Bangalore, India
 Christchurch City Libraries, New Zealand
 Cross Campus Library, the former name of Yale University's Bass Library

Laws and regulations 
 Climate Change Levy, a tax on energy delivered to non-domestic consumers in the United Kingdom
 Code of Canon Law (disambiguation), the Law of the Catholic Latin Rite
 Commerce Control List, a short name for Supplement No 1 to Part 774 of the US Export Administration Regulations
 Concealed Carry License, the ability to carry a concealed weapon in some states of the US
 Contaminant candidate list, a regulatory process for protecting drinking water in the United States
 Creative Commons License, a set of public copyright licenses that enable the free distribution of an otherwise copyrighted work

Science and mathematics
 CC chemokine ligand
 Computational Chemistry List
 Conjugacy class, a mathematical concept in group theory
 Connected Component Labeling, an algorithmic application of graph theory
 Convective condensation level
 Copper-clad laminates, key materials for making printed circuit boards (PCBs)
 Corneal collagen cross-linking, also known as CCL

Sports 
 CAF Champions League, an annual African club football (soccer) competition
 California Collegiate League, a US amateur baseball league featuring collegiate players on summer assignment
 Catholic Central League, a high school athletic conference in the Massachusetts Interscholastic Athletic Association
 Celebrity Cricket League, a cricket tournament in India between teams representing regional film industries of India
 Chicago Catholic League, a high school athletic conference in Illinois
 China Chess League
 Citrus Coast League, a high school athletic conference in California
 Coastal Canyon League, a high school athletic conference in California
 Collegiate Champions League, a basketball league in the Philippines 
 Colorado Cricket League
 Combined Counties Football League, a football league in England 
 CONCACAF Champions League, an annual North, Central American and Caribbean club football (soccer) competition

Other uses 
 250, in Roman numerals
 Chatham County Line, an American bluegrass musical group
 ChristChurch London, an evangelical Christian church in London, UK
 Circle MRT line, in Singapore
 Chinchilla Airport, IATA airport code "CCL"

la:CCL